is a 1691 anthology, considered the magnum opus of Bashō-school poetry. It contains four kasen renku as well as some 400 hokku, collected by Nozawa Bonchō and Mukai Kyorai under the supervision of Matsuo Bashō. Sarumino is one of the Seven Major Anthologies of Bashō (Bashō Shichibu Shū), and, together with the 1690 anthology, Hisago (The Gourd), it is considered to display Bashō's mature style (Shōfū) at its peak. Bashō's influence on all four of the kasen in Sarumino was profound and when he sat with Bonchō, Okada Yasui and Kyorai at Yoshinaka Temple to write "Kirigirisu", he extolled them, "Let's squeeze the juice from our bones."

Contents
 Preface by Takarai Kikaku
 Hokku
 Book 1: Winter (94 hokku)
 Book 2: Summer (94 hokku)
 Book 3: Autumn (76 hokku)
 Book 4: Spring (118 hokku)
  Book 5: Kasen
 Hatsushigure (Winter Rain), by Kyorai, Bonchō, Bashō, Fumikuni
 Natsu no Tsuki (Summer Moon), by Bonchō, Bashō, Kyorai
 Kirigirisu (Autumn Cricket), by Bonchō, Bashō, Yasui, Kyorai
 Ume Wakana (Grass and Plum), by Bashō, Otokuni, Chinseki, Sonan, Hanzan, Tohō, Enpū, Bonchō and others
 Book 6: Notes to "Record of an Unreal Dwelling"

Example
The first side of the renku Natsu no Tsuki (Summer Moon), translated by Donald Keene:

In the city
What a heavy smell of things!
The summer moon.
(Bonchō)

How hot it is! How hot it is!
Voices call at gate after gate.
(Kyorai)

The second weeding
Has not even been finished,
But the rice is in ear.
(Bashō)

Brushing away the ashes,
A single smoked sardine.
(Bonchō)

In this neighborhood
They don't even recognize money—
How inconvenient!
(Bashō)

He just stands there stupidly
Wearing a great big dagger.
(Kyorai)

Translations

English
 Maeda Cana, translator. Monkey's Raincoat. Grossman Publishers 1973. SBN 670-48651-5
 Earl Miner and Hiroko Odagiri, translators. The Monkey’s Straw Raincoat and Other Poetry of the Basho School. Princeton University Press 1981. 
 Lenore Mayhew, translator. Monkey's Raincoat: Linked Poetry of the Basho School with Haiku Selections. Tuttle, 1985.

Other languages

French
 René Sieffert, translator. Le Manteau de pluie du Singe. Société Franco-japonaise de Paris, 1986. 
 Georges Friedenkraft and Majima Haruki, translators. L'imperméable de paille du singe. l'Association Française de Haïku, 2011 (appeared previously in the Bulletin de l'Association des Anciens Élèves de l'INALCO, April 1992, p93)

German
 Geza S. Dombrady, translator. Das Affenmäntelchen. Dieterich'sche, 1994

Translations of individual kasen
 Hatsushigure (Winter Rain)
 Makoto Ueda. Matsuo Bashō. Kodansha 1982.  pp70–90
 R. H. Blyth. Haiku, Volume One: Eastern Culture. Hokuseido Press 1981.  pp126–138
 Hiroaki Sato and Burton Watson. From the Country of Eight Islands. Columbia University Press 1986.  pp300–303
 Earl Miner. Japanese Linked Poetry: An account with translations of renga and haikai sequences. Princeton University Press 1979. pp277–297
 Etsuko Terasaki. "Hatsushigure: A Linked Verse Series by Bashō and his Disciples." Harvard Journal of Asiatic Studies, 36 (1976), pp204–239
 Geoffrey Bownas and Anthony Thwaite. The Penguin Book of Japanese Verse. Penguin, 1964  pp124–127
 William J. Higginson. The Haiku Seasons: Poetry of the Natural World. Kodansha, 1996  pp51–55 (verses 1–12 only)
 Mario Riccò and Paolo Lagazzi, eds. Il muschio e la rugiada: Antologia di poesia giapponese. RCS Libri & Grandi Opere, 1996.  pp82–94 
 Natsu no Tsuki (Summer Moon)
 Donald Keene. World Within Walls: A History of Japanese Literature, Volume 2. Columbia University Press 1999.  pp111–114
 Makoto Ueda. Matsuo Bashō. Kodansha 1982.  pp90–111
 Steven D. Carter. Traditional Japanese Poetry: An Anthology. Stanford University Press, 1991.  pp366–375
 Noriko de Vroomen and Leo de Ridder. De zomermaan en andere Japanse kettingverzen. Meulenhoff 1984.  pp29–53 
 Miyamoto and Ueyama Masaoj, editors. Hajka antologio. L'Omnibuso-Kioto 1981. p195 (verses 1–10 only) 
 Kirigirisu (Autumn Cricket)
 Earl Miner. Japanese Linked Poetry: An account with translations of renga and haikai sequences. Princeton University Press 1979. pp316–335
 Chris Drake. "Bashō's 'Cricket Sequence' as English Literature" in Journal of Renga & Renku Volume 2, 2012. pp7–65
 Eiko Yachimoto and John Carley. "The Lye Tub" in Journal of Renga & Renku Volume 1, 2010. pp67–70
 Jos Vos. Eeuwige reizigers: Een bloemlezing uit de klassieke Japanse literatuur. De Arbeiderspers, 2008.  pp572–579

References

Bibliography
 Lenore Mayhew, translator. Monkey's Raincoat: Linked Poetry of the Basho School with Haiku Selections. Tuttle, 1985. 
 Haruo Shirane. Traces of Dreams: Landscape, Cultural Memory, and the Poetry of Basho. Stanford University Press, 1998. 
 Nobuyuki Yuasa. The Narrow Road to the Deep North. Penguin, 1966. 
 Donald Keene. World Within Walls: A History of Japanese Literature, Volume 2. Columbia University Press 1999. 

Edo-period works
Japanese poetry collections
Collaborative poetry
Articles containing Japanese poems
1691 books